Antinephele maculifera is a moth of the family Sphingidae. It was described by William Jacob Holland in 1889, and is known from Sierra Leone to the Democratic Republic of the Congo and Uganda. It is also found in Kenya, Malawi, Tanzania and Zimbabwe. It is known from forests and wooded habitats.

References

Antinephele
Moths of Sub-Saharan Africa
Lepidoptera of Uganda
Insects of the Central African Republic
Lepidoptera of Gabon
Lepidoptera of Malawi
Lepidoptera of Tanzania
Lepidoptera of Zimbabwe
Moths described in 1889